Mandol may refer to:

Mandol (antibiotic), the antibiotic cefamandole
Algerian mandole or mandol, a musical instrument
Mandol District, in Nuristan Province, Afghanistan

See also

Mandal (disambiguation)
Mandolin, a musical instrument
Mandolute, a musical instrument